Hippolyte Bernheim (17 April 1840, in Mulhouse – 2 February 1919, in Paris) was a French physician and neurologist. He is chiefly known for his theory of suggestibility in relation to hypnotism.

Life
Born into a Jewish family, Bernheim received his education in his native town and at the University of Strasbourg, where he was graduated as doctor of medicine in 1867. The same year he became a lecturer at the university and established himself as a physician in the city.

When, in 1871, after the Franco-Prussian war, Strasbourg passed to Germany, Bernheim moved to Nancy (where he met and later collaborated with Dr. Ambroise-Auguste Liébeault), in the university of which town he became clinical professor.

The Nancy School
When the medical faculty took up hypnotism, about 1880, Bernheim was very enthusiastic, and soon became one of the leaders of the investigation. He became a well-known authority in this new field of medicine.

Albert Moll (1862–1939), an active promoter of hypnotism in Germany, went to Nancy and studied with Bernheim; while in the United States Boris Sidis and Morton Prince were also considered part of the Nancy School.

Bernheim also had a significant influence on Sigmund Freud, who had visited Bernheim in 1889, and witnessed some of his experiments (though he was known as an antagonist of Jean-Martin Charcot with whom Freud had studied in Paris). Freud had already translated Bernheim's On Suggestion and its Applications to Therapy in 1888; and later described how "I was a spectator of Bernheim's astonishing experiments upon his hospital patients, and I received the profoundest impression of the possibility that there could be powerful mental processes which nevertheless remained hidden from the consciousness of man". He would later term himself a pupil of Bernheim, and it was out of his practice of Bernheim's suggestion/hypnosis that psychoanalysis would evolve.

Bernheim himself increasingly turned from hypnosis to the use of suggestion in a waking state. In 1886, he adopted Hack Tuke's term 'psycho-therapeutic action'  and in 1891 he used the term 'psychotherapy' in the title of book as a synonym for his suggestive therapeutics.

Acknowledged false memories
One of the earliest accounts of a false memory which was induced by a therapist comes from Bernheim in the 1880s. Bernheim suggested to his patient Marie that she had witnessed an old bachelor rape a young girl. After the session, Bernheim said: "it is not a dream; it is not a vision I have given you during your hypnotic sleep; it is the truth itself; and if inquiry is made into this crime later on, you will tell the truth" (Bernheim, 1889, p. 165). One of Bernheim's friends asked Marie about the event three days later, and she gave a perfect recollection of the alleged event, including the name of the rapist and his victim, as well as the date, time, and place of the crime. Bernheim then tested Marie's confidence in her testimony by asking if it was not perhaps a "vision like those [he] was in the habit of giving her during her sleep" (Bernheim, 1889, p. 165; original French in Bernheim, 1884, p. 12), but Marie remained adamant of the veracity of the story. Marie even agreed to testify at a trial, under oath.

Criticism

Bernheim has been criticised for failing to recognise the role of what Pierre Janet called the rapport between hypnotizer and hypnotised - the element from which Freud would evolve the concept of transference.

Works
Bernheim wrote many works, of which the following are mentioned here:

 "Des Fièvres Typhiques en Général", Strasburg, 1868;
 "Leçon de Clinique Médicale", Paris, 1877;
 "De la Suggestion dans l'État Hypnotique et dans l'État de Veille", Paris, 1884;
 "De la Suggestion et de son Application à la Thérapeutique", Paris, 1887.

English translations:
 Bernheim, H., (Herter, C.A. trans.), Suggestive Therapeutics: A Treatise on the Nature and Uses of Hypnotism, (De la Suggestion et de son Application à la Thérapeutique, [Second Edition], 1887), G.P. Putnam's Sons, (New York), 1889.
 Bernheim H., New Studies in Hypnotism, [Trans. by Sandor R.S, of Bernheim's French (1891) Hypnotisme, Suggestion, Psychothérapie: Études Nouvelles], International University's Press, (New York), 1980.

References

Further reading

 Alexandre Klein, "Et Nancy devint la capitale de l'hypnose" https://web.archive.org/web/20110819154617/http://www.estrepublicain.fr/fr/philosophie/info/5262459-Et-Nancy-devint-capitale-de-l-hypnose
 Alexandre Klein,« Nouveau regard sur l’Ecole hypnologique de Nancy à partir d’archives inédites », Le Pays Lorrain, 2010/4, p. 337-348. 
 Alexandre Klein,« "Lire le corps pour percer l’âme" : outils et appareils à l’aube de la psychologie scientifique à Nancy », Guignard, L., Raggi, P., Thévenin, E., (dir.), 2011, Corps et machines à l’âge industriel, Rennes, PUR, p. 41-54.

External links
 

French hypnotists
French neurologists
University of Strasbourg alumni
Academic staff of the University of Strasbourg
19th-century French Jews
Alsatian Jews
People from Mulhouse
1840 births
1919 deaths
Burials at Père Lachaise Cemetery